The 2012 U.S. Figure Skating Championships was a figure skating national championship during the 2011–12 season. Medals were awarded in the disciplines of men's singles, ladies' singles, pair skating and ice dancing on the senior, junior, and novice levels. The competition was part of the selection process for several international events, including the 2012 World Championships.

The event was held at the HP Pavilion in San Jose, California on January 22–29, 2012.

Senior results

Senior men

Senior ladies

Senior pairs

Senior ice dancing

Junior results

Junior men

Junior ladies

Junior pairs

Junior ice dancing

Novice results

Novice men

Novice ladies

Novice pairs

Novice ice dancing

International team selections

Four Continents Championships
The U.S. team to the 2012 Four Continents Championships: After Abbott withdrew from the Four Continents due to injury, the assignment was given to Richard Dornbush, who finished 13th at the U.S. Championships.

World Junior Championships
The U.S. team to the 2012 World Junior Championships:

World Championships
The U.S. team to the 2012 World Championships:

References

External links
 Official site
 2012 United States Figure Skating Championships results
 Men SP results
 Ladies SP results
 Pairs SP results
 Dance SD results

2012
United States Figure Skating Championships, 2012
United States Championships
Figure Skating Championships
United States Figure Skating Championships
January 2012 sports events in the United States